Royal Noble Consort Yeong of the Jeonui Yi clan (영빈 전의 이씨, 暎嬪 全義 李氏; 15 August 1696 — 23 August 1764), alternatively known as Lady Seonhui (선희궁, 宣禧宮), was a concubine of King Yeongjo of Joseon and the mother of Crown Prince Sado. She is most well known for advising Yeongjo to execute their son, as the latter suffered from serious mental illnesses.

Biography

Early life 
The future Royal Noble Consort Yeong was born into the Jeonui Yi clan on August 15, 1696, to Yi Yu-beon, and his wife, Lady Kim of the Hanyang Kim clan. 

In 1701 (the 24th year of King Sukjong’s reign), at the age of 6, Lady Yi entered the palace and became a gungnyeo.

Palace life
In 1726, at the age of 31, Lady Yi became a concubine of King Yeongjo, in his second year of reign. She was given the rank of Sug-ui (숙의, 淑儀; junior second rank concubine).

A year later, in 1727, Royal Consort Sug-ui gave birth to a daughter, Princess Hwapyeong.

She was promoted to the rank of Gwi-in (귀인, 貴人; junior first rank concubine) in October, that same year.

Between 1728 and 1732, she gave birth to three daughters: one died at the age of 3, the second at the age of 2, and the third at the age of 4.

In 1730, she was finally promoted to the most senior rank of Bin (빈, 嬪; senior first rank concubine), with the prefix Yeong (暎), meaning "shining".

In 1732, she gave birth to her fifth daughter, Princess Hwahyeop. Her sixth daughter, Yi Yong-wan, Princess Hwawan, was born in 1738.

Yi Yeong-bin gave birth to the heir apparent in 1735. Yi Seon was not the first male child to be born to Yeongjo, but the death of Crown Prince Hyojang, nearly seven years earlier, meant that the court was particularly pleased to welcome another son.

Yeongjo ordered Sado to be brought up in a palace quite far from the main residence, so Lady Yi did not personally oversee his upbringing. The court ladies in charge of looking after the prince apparently slighted Noble Consort Yeong frequently, as they considered her to be of common birth.

Her daughter-in-law recorded that she was affectionate toward her children, but very strict and taught them, "as if she were not their mother." However, she tended to her children personally when they fell ill.

When Lady Hong entered the palace to marry Crown Prince Sado, Consort Yeong treated her as one of her own children, despite the fact that the Crown Princess was expected to address the King's primary wife, Queen Jeongseong, as her mother-in-law.

In 1748, Princess Hwapyeong died at the age of 21, and Lady Yi is recorded as having grieved excessively.

After the death of his primary wife, Yeongjo married his second queen, in 1759. Consort Yeong supported his decision to remarry and assisted in preparing the state celebrations.

She was aware that the King disliked the Crown Prince, an issue that Queen Jeongseong discussed frequently with her. She was also aware that her son was suffering from a serious mental illness and that he was killing ladies-in-waiting and eunuchs, as the Crown Princess went to her for advice after Sado's first murder, in 1757. Though initially Lady Yi wanted to talk to Sado, her daughter-in-law persuaded her not to, as she feared the consequences if Sado found out she had spoken to his mother. In 1760, the Crown Prince lost his temper at a birthday celebration and cursed at his mother and children. When he began to threaten Princess Hwawan to gain more personal freedoms, Consort Yeong attended their meetings, as she feared for her daughter's safety. During one meeting, in 1760, she witness Sado threaten to "slash Princess Hwawan with [his] sword."

Execution of Crown Prince Sado
On 4 July 1762, Yi Yeong-bin wrote to Crown Princess Hong in response to the rumour that the Crown Prince had attempted to enter the upper palace to kill his father. In the letter, she apologised preemptively to her daughter-in-law. On the same day, she spoke to Yeongjo and stated that Sado's illness was uncontrollable. She advised him that Sado should be removed, but his wife and son should not be harmed. After the King left, Lady Yi apparently beat her chest and refused to eat.

After the execution of Sado, Lady Hyegyeong records that Consort Yeong transferred her love to her grandson, who moved into the upper palace and slept in the same room as his grandmother. She organised his meals and study sessions.

Death and burial
Royal Noble Consort Yeong developed a tumor on her back and died on August 23, 1764. In the opinion of her daughter-in-law, Consort Yeong's intense grief after the execution of her son also weakened her.

She was buried in the Seooneung Cluster, in Goyang, Gyeonggi Province. The tomb is known as Sugyeongwon (수경원, 綏慶園). Her memorial tablet was enshrined in Chilgung (or the "Palace Of Seven Royal Concubines").

During the reign of Gojong, Lady Yi was posthumously honoured with the title Soyu (소유, 昭裕).

Family
 Father: Yi Yu-beon (이유번, 李楡蕃)
 Grandfather: Yi Yeong-im (이영임, 李英任)
 Mother: Lady Kim of the Hanyang Kim clan (정경부인 한양 김씨, 貞敬夫人 漢陽 金氏)
 Grandfather: Kim Woo-jung (김우종, 金佑宗)
 Grandmother: Lady Yi of the Jeonju Yi clan (전주 이씨, 全州 李氏)
 Husband: Yi Geum, King Yeongjo of Joseon (31 October 1694 – 22 April 1776) (이금 영조대왕)
 Daughter: Princess Hwapyeong (27 April 1727 – 24 June 1748) (화평 옹주, 和平 翁主)
Son-in-law: Park Myeong-won, Prince Consort Geumseong of the Bannam Park clan (1725 – 1790) (박명원 금성위, 朴明源 錦城尉)
 Adoptive grandson: Park Sang-cheol (1737 – 1761) (박상철, 朴相喆)
 Unnamed daughter (3 August 1728 – 18 February 1731)
 Unnamed daughter (12 December 1729 – 21 March 1731)
 Unnamed daughter (1 January 1732 – 12 April 1736)
Daughter: Princess Hwahyeop (1733 – 1752) (화협 옹주, 和協 翁主)
Son-in-law: Shin Gwang-su, Prince Consort Yeongseong of the Pyeongsan Shin clan (1731 – 1775) (신광수 영성위, 申光洙 永城尉)
 Adoptive grandson: Shin Jae-seon (1753 – 1810) (신재선, 申在善)
 Son: Yi Seon, Crown Prince Sado (13 February 1735 – 12 July 1762) (이선 사도세자)
 Daughter-in-law: Crown Princess Consort Hong of the Pungsan Hong clan (6 August 1735 – 13 January 1816) (혜빈 풍산 홍씨) 
 Grandson: Yi Jeong, Crown Prince Uiso (27 September 1750 – 17 April 1752) (이정 의소세자)
 Grandson: Yi San, King Jeongjo (28 October 1752 – 18 August 1800) (이산 정조대왕)
 Granddaughter: Princess Cheongyeon (1754 – 9 June 1821) (청연 공주)
 Granddaughter: Princess Cheongseon (1756 – 20 July 1802) (청선 공주)
Daughter: Yi Yong-wan, Princess Hwawan (9 March 1738 – 10 June 1808) (이용완 화완 옹주, 李蓉婉 和緩 翁主)
Son-in-law: Jeong Chi-dal, Prince Consort Ilseong of the Yeonil Jeong clan (정치달 일성위, 鄭致達 日城尉) (14 December 1732 – 15 February 1757)
 Granddaughter: Lady Jeong of the Yeonil Jeong clan (연일 정씨, 延日 鄭氏) (3 August 1756 – 1756)
 Adoptive grandson: Jeong Hu-gyeom (정후겸, 鄭厚謙) (1749 – 1776)

Popular culture
 Portrayed by Kim Yoon-kyung in the 1988 MBC TV series 500 Years of Joseon:Memoirs of Lady Hyegyeong.
Portrayed by Jung Hye-sun in the 1998 MBC TV series The King's Road.
Portrayed by Jeon Hye-jin in the 2015 film The Throne.
Portrayed by Nam Gi Ae in the 2021 MBC TV series The Red Sleeve.

References

Notes

Works cited

18th-century Korean people
1696 births
1764 deaths
Royal consorts of the Joseon dynasty
18th-century Korean women